The 1921 Bucknell football team was an American football team that represented Bucknell University as an independent during the 1921 college football season. In its third season under head coach Pete Reynolds, the team compiled a 5–3–1 record and outscored opponents by a total of 179 to 66.

Schedule

References

Bucknell
Bucknell Bison football seasons
Bucknell football